Larry Giles (November 1, 1947 - June 12, 2021) was an American historical preservationist and pioneering architectural salvager who founded the National Building Arts Center. He was also an important figure in the operations of the early community radio station, KDNA, a predecessor to KDHX.

Death
Giles died of complications due to leukemia on June 12, 2021.

See also 
 Bob Cassilly

References 

1947 births
2021 deaths
People from St. Louis
Historical preservationists
United States Marine Corps non-commissioned officers
United States Marine Corps personnel of the Vietnam War
American anti–Vietnam War activists
Activists from St. Louis
Businesspeople from St. Louis